"Nightfalls" is a song co-written and recorded by Australian country artist Keith Urban, released as a single on 31 March 2022. Urban wrote the song with Greg Kurstin and Mozella, while Kurstin produced the track. The song was released as a single to radio formats in Australia, Canada, New Zealand, Sweden, and the United Kingdom.

Background
Urban previewed "Nightfalls" by posting two videos on social media prior to its release, saying "two summers have gone by without touring and the desire to have that feeling again inspired every part of creating this song". He described the process of writing the song with Greg Kurstin and Mozella as "pure joy," saying he wanted to "try and bring something to help us exhale and be in the moment – if only for 3 mins and 41 seconds". The song was premiered on BBC Radio 2 in the United Kingdom on 31 March 2022. It was released while Urban's single "Wild Hearts" continued to be promoted at country radio in the United States.

Critical reception
Sterling Whitaker of Taste of Country described "Nightfalls" as a "very progressive pop-country track that's perfect for summer". Caleigh DeCaprio of Country Swag reviewed the song favourably, saying it would "have you up on your feet, wanting to be dancing the night away with your person and drunk on each other when the night falls". Tiffany Goldstein of CMT stated that while the song does not highlight Urban's guitar-playing ability, it showcases his "robust vocals", noting the use of the keyboard and drum beats, calling it a "radio-ready anthem" that is "perfect" for his upcoming "The Speed of Now World Tour".

Credits and personnel
Adapted from AllMusic.

 Ethan Barrette – engineer
 Julian Burg – engineer
 Serban Ghenea – mixing
 John Hanes – engineer
 Scott Johnson – production coordination
 David Kalmusky – recording
 Greg Kurstin – bass guitar, composition, drums, engineer, electric guitar, keyboards, production, synthesizer
 Maureen McDonald – composition, backing vocals
 Randy Merrill – mastering engineer
 Alberto Sewald – assistant engineer
 Matt Tuggle – engineer
 Keith Urban – composition, acoustic guitar, electric guitar, lead vocals, backing vocals

Charts

References

2022 songs
2022 singles
Keith Urban songs
Songs written by Keith Urban
Songs written by Greg Kurstin
Songs written by Mozella
Song recordings produced by Greg Kurstin
Capitol Records Nashville singles
Universal Music Group singles